Sörstafors is a locality situated in Hallstahammar Municipality, Västmanland County, Sweden with 278 inhabitants in 2010.

References 

Populated places in Västmanland County
Populated places in Hallstahammar Municipality